The Anne Elder Trust Fund Award for poetry was administered by the Victorian branch of the Fellowship of Australian Writers from its establishment in 1976 until 2017. From 2018 the award has been administered by Australian Poetry. It is awarded annually, as the Anne Elder Award, for the best first book of poetry published in Australia. It was established in 1976 and currently has a prize of A$1000 for the winner. The award is named after Australian poet Anne Elder (1918–1976).

Award winners

Prior to 2004

 1977: Laurie Duggan, East (R. Kenny); and Graeme Curtis, At Last No Reply (Makar Press)
 1978: Lee Cataldi, Invitation to a Marxist lesbian party (Wild & Woolley)

 1980: Richard Lunn, Pompeii Deep Fry (Randolph Press)
 1981: Gig Ryan,  The Division of Anger (Transit Press); and Jenny Boult, The hotel anonymous (Bent Enterprises)
 1982: Kate Llewellyn, Trader Kate and the Elephants (Friendly Street Poets); and Peter Goldsworthy,  Readings from Ecclesiastes (Angus & Robertson)
 1983: David Brooks,  The Cold Front (Hale & Iremonger)
 1984: Doris Brett, The truth about unicorns (Jacaranda Press)
 1985: Stephen J Williams, A Crowd of Voices (Pariah Press Co-op)
 1986: Jan Owen, Boy with Telescope (Angus & Robertson)
 1987: Sarah Day, A Hunger to be Less Serious (Angus & Robertson)
 1988: Alex Skovron, The Rearrangement (Melbourne University Press)
 1991: Alison Croggon, This is the Stone (Penguin Books)
 1992: Christopher Kelen, The Naming of the Harbour and the Trees (Hale & Iremonger)
 1993: Nicolette Stasko, Abundance (Angus & Robertson)
 1994: Terry Whitebeach, Bird Dream in Four New Poets (Penguin)
 1995: Jennifer Harrison, Michelangelo's Prisoners (Black Pepper)
 1996: Marcella Polain, Dumbstruck (Five Islands)
 1997: Morgan Yasbincek, Night Reversing (Fremantle Arts Centre Press)
 1998: Jane Williams, Outside Temple Boundaries (Five Islands Press)
 1999: Amanda Stewart, I/T: Selected poems 1980–1996 (Here and There/Split Records)
 2002: Bronwyn Lea, Flight Animals (UQP)
 2003: Chris Andrews, Cut Lunch (Indigo)
 2003: Kathryn Lomer, Extraction of Arrows (UQP)

2004
 Winner: Lidija Cvetkovic, War is not the Season for Figs (UQP)
 Highly Commended: Peter Lyssiotis, The Bird, The Belltower (Modern Writing); Miriam Wei Wei Lo, Against Certain Capture (Five Islands)
 Commended: Lucy Alexander Feathered Tongues (Five Islands); David Musgrave To Thalia (Five Islands)

2005
 Winner: Max Ryan, Rainswayed Night (Dangerously Poetic)
 Highly commended: Lucy Holt, Stories of Bird (Poets Union)
 Commended: Luis Gonzalez Serrano, Cities with Moveable Parts (Poets Union)

2006
 Winner: Libby Hart, Fresh News from the Arctic (Interactive Press)
 Highly Commended: Luke Beesley, Lemon Shark (Paper Tiger Media); Francesca Haig Bodies of Water (Five Islands Press); and Paul Magee Cube root of book (John Leonard Press)
 Commended: Jennifer Chrystie, Polishing the Silver (Ginninderra Press); Nathan Shepherdson, Sweeping the Light Back into the Mirror (UQP); and Simon West, First Names (Puncher & Wattmann)

2007
 Winner: Judith Bishop, Event (Salt Publishing)
 Commended: Elizabeth Campbell, Letters to the Tremulous Hand (John Leonard Press); Sarah French, Songs Orphans Sing (Five Islands Press); Hal Judge, Someone Forgot to Tell the Fish (Interactive Publications); and Petra White, The Incoming Tide (John Leonard Press)

2008
 Winner: Sarah Holland-Batt, Aria (University of Queensland Press); and Sandy Fitts, View from the Lucky Hotel (Five Islands Press)
 Highly Commended: Elizabeth Hodgson, Skin Painting (UQP)
 Commended: David Adès Mapping the World (Wakefield Press); and Carol Jenkins, Fishing in the Devonians (Puncher & Wattmann)

2009
 Winner: Emma Jones, The Striped World (Faber and Faber)
Highly Commended: Emily Ballou, The Darwin Poems (UWA Publishing)
Commended: Felicity Plunkett, Vanishing Point (University of Queensland Press)

2010
 Winner: Rosanna Licari, An Absence of Saints (University of Queensland Press)
Highly Commended: Andy Jackson, Among the Regulars (Paper Tiger)
Commended: Rachael Petridis, Sundecked (The Australian Poetry Centre); Chloe Wilson, The Mermaid Problem (The Australian Poetry Centre); Peter Coghill, The Rockclimber's Hands (Picaro); and Leah Kaminsky, Stitching Things Together (Interactive Press)

2011
 Winner: Mags Webster, The Weather of Tongues(Sunline]; 
Highly Commended: Michelle Dicinoski, Electricity for Beginners (Clouds of Magellan)
Commended: Vladislav Neklianv, Another Babylon(UQP); Fiona Wright, Knuckled (Giramondo)

2012
 Winner: Elizabeth Allen, Body Language (Vagabond Press)
 Highly Commended: Eileen Chong, Burning Rice (Australian Poetry)
 Commended: Toby Finch, Rawshock (Puncher and Wattman); Susan McCreery, Waiting for Southerly (Gininderra Press);

2013
 Winner: Vanessa Page, Confessional Box (Walleah Press)
 Commended: Susan Adams, Beside Rivers (Island Press); Luke Fischer, Paths of Flight (Black Pepper); Vanessa Kirkpatrick, To Catch the Light (Fence Post Press); Ainslee Meredith, Pinetorch (Australian Poetry/Express Media)

2014
 Winner: Cathy Altmann, Circumnavigation (Poetica Christi Press)

2015
Winner: John Hawke, Aurelia (Cordite Books)
Highly commended: Shari Kocher, The Non-Sequitur of Snow (Puncher & Wattmann), Linda Weste, Nothing Sacred (Australian Scholarly Publishing)

2016
Winner: Berndt Sellheim, Awake at the Wheel (Vagabond Press)
Commended: Stuart Barnes (poet), Glasshouses (University of Queensland Press), Lisa Brockwell, Earth Girls (Pitt Street Poetry), J. H. Crone, Our Lady of the Fence Post (UWA Publishing), Susan Varga, Rupture (UWA Publishing)
Special Mention: Carmine Frascarelli, Sydney Road Poems (Rabbit Poets Series)

2017
Winner: Rico Craig, Bone Ink (Guillotine Press)
Highly commended: Bella Li, Argosy (Vagabond Press) 
Commended: Shastra Deo, The Agonist (University of Queensland Press), Omar Sakr, These Wild Houses (Cordite Books)

2018
Winner: Eunice Andrada, Flood Damages (Giramondo)
Commended: Maryam Azam, The Hijab Files (Giramondo), Marjon Mossammaparast, That Sight (Cordite), Lindsay Tuggle, Calenture (Cordite) and Rae White, Milk Teeth (UQP)

2019
Winners: Cham Zhi Yi, blur by the (Subbed In), Gareth Sion Jenkins, Recipes for the Disaster (5 Islands Press)
Commended: Alice Allan, The Empty Show (Rabbit Poets Series), Belinda Rule, The Things the Mind Sees Happen (Slow Loris/Puncher & Wattmann)

2020 
Winner: Ella Jeffrey, Dead Bolt (Puncher & Wattmann)
Commended:  Luke Best, Cadaver Dog (UQP); Rebecca Jessen, Ask Me About the Future (UQP)

2021 

 Winner:  Audrey Molloy, The Important Things (Gallery Press)
 Highly Commended: Evelyn Araluen, Dropbear (UQP); Lucy Van, The Open (Cordite); Damen O'Brien, Animals With Human Voices (Recent Work)
 Commended: James Lucas, Rare Bird (Recent Work)

See also
 List of poetry awards
 List of years in poetry
 List of years in literature

References

External links
 Fellowship of Australian Writers Home page

Awards established in 1976
Australian poetry awards
1976 establishments in Australia